Chor Pe Mor  is a 1990 Bollywood crime comedy film directed by Kapil Kapoor and starring Naseeruddin Shah, Karan Shah, Neelam, Sonam in lead roles.

Cast
Naseeruddin Shah as Inspector Chanakya
Karan Shah as Raja
Neelam Kothari as Ritu
Sonam as Basanti
Satish Shah as Tijorimal
Kiran Kumar as Dhanpat Indrajeet Garodia "D.I.G."

Soundtrack
Lyrics: Gulshan Bawra

External links
 

1990 films
1990s Hindi-language films
Films scored by R. D. Burman